P. Shanmugam (10 October 1946 – 14 February 2006) (born to Shri S Panchatcharam Mudaliyar - Kamala Ammal) was the Member of Parliament for Vellore constituency (Lok Sabha). He has served during the period of 1996. He was also a social worker, businessman and agriculturist.

During the Lok Sabha election held during the year 1996, he defeated his opponent B. Akber Pasha by 211035 votes.

After that he became the district head for DMK for Vellore District. He also played a major role in the DMK.

He was President for

(i) 'Mat Weavers' Cooperative Society, Agaramcheri, 1997 onwards; and 

(ii) Ambur Marketing Society, Ambur, 1997 onwards.

References

1946 births
2006 deaths
Dravida Munnetra Kazhagam politicians
Lok Sabha members from Tamil Nadu
People from Vellore district